Tang Peng Choi (born 14 June 1924) is a Malaysian former sports shooter. He competed in the 50 metre rifle, prone event at the 1964 Summer Olympics.

Tang is from Selangor. He represented the Federation of Malaya at the 1959 and 1961 Southeast Asian Peninsular Games, winning bronze at the latter in the three positions event. He ranked first in the Malaysian domestic selection trials for shooting at the 1966 Asian Games, and was assigned to the prone rifle team along with Tan Seng Keat, Wong Foo Wah, and Chan Kooi Chye. He later represented Malaysia at the first Asian Shooting Championships in 1967.

References

External links
 

1924 births
Possibly living people
Malaysian male sport shooters
Olympic shooters of Malaysia
Shooters at the 1964 Summer Olympics
Place of birth missing (living people)